Homosassa ella is a species of snout moth. It was described by George Duryea Hulst in 1887. It is found in North America, including Florida, Oklahoma, South Carolina and West Virginia.

References

Moths described in 1887
Anerastiini